The Dundee City Hall and Fire Station was located at 4921 Underwood Avenue in the present-day Dundee neighborhood of Omaha, Nebraska.

History 
Dundee's downtown was located at 50th and Underwood by 1910. The combined Dundee City Hall and fire station was built in 1913, and was located along the streetcar line.

See also 
 History of Omaha, Nebraska

References

External links 
 Modern photo

History of Omaha, Nebraska
Government buildings completed in 1914
City and town halls in Nebraska
1914 establishments in Nebraska